As the capital of North Macedonia, Skopje is home to several sports teams and venues. FK Vardar and FK Rabotnički are the two strongest and most popular football teams, whilst RK Kometal Gjorče Petrov is the most popular handball team, being a European Women's EHF Champions League champion for 2002.While WHC Vardar are five-time medalists with three bronze and two silver medals at Women's EHF Champions League F4. RK Vardar and RK Metalurg are two main male handball teams. RK Vardar are the Men's EHF Champions League  2017 Champions, and MZT Skopje and Rabotnički are best in basketball.

Events 

Recently, Skopje was the host of the following events:

 2006 W.A.K.O. European Championships
 2008 European Women's Handball Championship, Skopje Sports Arena
 2008 Women's Junior World Championship
 2009 Men's U20 European Basketaball Championship - Division B
 2010 European Twenty20 Championship
 2010 UEFA Women's Under-19 Championship
 2011 Davis Cup Europe Zone Group III
 2017 UEFA Super Cup

Organizations

Sports venues
Skopje has four major sports indoor halls, of which the Boris Trajkovski Sports Arena is the biggest. The main stadium is the Philip II Arena and it hosts the North Macedonia national football team.

See also
Sport in North Macedonia